John Allan (born 11 May 1890, date of death unknown) was a footballer who played in The Football League for Everton, Leeds City and Coventry City. He also played for Bedlington United, Carlisle United, Rochdale and Walsall. He was born in Carlisle, England.

References

English footballers
Everton F.C. players
Walsall F.C. players
Coventry City F.C. players
Rochdale A.F.C. players
Leeds City F.C. players
Carlisle United F.C. players
English Football League players
1890 births
Year of death missing
Bedlington United A.F.C. players
Association football wing halves
Footballers from Carlisle, Cumbria
Place of death missing